Nilambur–Shoranur line is a -long single-line, non-electrified broad-gauge (1676 mm) railway spur branch line of the Indian Railways connecting Nilambur Road railway station in Malappuram district with  in Palakkad district in the state of Kerala. It is a branch line administered by the Palakkad railway division of the Southern Railway zone and one of the shortest broad-gauge railway lines in India. It was laid by the British in colonial era for the transportation of Nilambur Teak logs into United Kingdom through Kozhikode.

History

In 1840, the British created a teak plantation in Nilambur to ensure a steady supply of timber for their various needs. In 1923, the South Indian Railway Company, which operated the Madras–Shoranur–Mangalore line, was contracted by the Madras Presidency to build a railway from Nilambur to Shoranur to ensure easy transportation of timber from these forests to the plains and hence to ports and onward transportation. The company completed line in stages. The Shoranur–Angadippuram section was opened on 3 February 1927, Angadippuram–Vaniyambalam on 3 August 1927 and the entire stretch from Shoranur to Nilambur was opened on 26 October 1927. During World War II, the Shoranur line, along with other numerous railway lines across British India were dismantled and rolling stock diverted to the Middle East to help British war efforts. The line ceased to exist in 1941. After independence, following public pressure, the railway line was reconstructed by the Indian Railways along its original alignment. The Shornur -Angadipuram line re-opened in 1953 and Angadipuram–Nilambur in 1954. The teak plantation still stands today as a major tourist attraction.

Geography
The Shoranur–Nilambur line starts from Shoranur Junction and terminates at Nilambur Road railway station, located at a distance of four kilometers from Nilambur town on the Kozhikode–Ooty highway,  from the district headquarters of Malappuram town. The line passes through the eastern part of the Malappuram district. It crosses Kunthippuzha between Kulukkalloor and Cherukara which borders Palakkad and Malappuram districts. Velliyar river, a major tributary of Kadalundi river (between Pattikkad and Melattur), Olippuzha river, another tributary of Kadalundi river (between Melattur and Tuvvur) and Kuthirappuzha, a tributary of Chaliyar river (between Vaniyambalam and Nilambur road) are other major rivers that this line crosses.

Railway stations on the Shoranur–Nilambur Road line are supported by small buildings and the platforms are low and short, located among thick vegetation that reaches close to the track throughout the stretch. Teak and banyan trees are common, with overhanging roots of banyan trees present on many station platforms, with the tree canopy completely covering many stations. The Nilambur Road railway station itself offers a views against the backdrop of the Western Ghats.

Operations 
Services on the Shoranur–Nilambur Road line consist of five pairs of passenger trains (now unreserved express special) and two express trains, all running daily. Four of passenger trains run between Shoranur and Nilambur, while one pair run to Nilambur from Palakkad. Two express trains, the 16349/16350
Kochuveli–Nilambur Road Rajya Rani Express and the 16325/16326 Nilambur-Kottayam Express are currently running. Locomotives used on the line are the WDM-2, WDM-3A, WDM-3D, WDG-3A from the Diesel Loco Shed, Ernakulam; Diesel Loco Shed, Erode and Diesel Loco Shed, Golden Rock

See also
 Edakkara town
 Angadippuram town

References

External links

 www.southernrailway.org

5 ft 6 in gauge railways in India

Transport in Malappuram district